Crisis in the Built Environment: The Case of the Muslim City, a book by King Faisal University professor Jamel Akbar, describes the urban environment in the Traditional Muslim city, according to form of control and submission, rather than by visual elements.

References

External links
Download from ArchNet's Digital Library

1988 non-fiction books
Architecture books